Eugen Gustav Dücker (also Eugène Gustav Dücker; , in Arensburg (now Kuressaare, Estonia) – 6 December 1916, in Düsseldorf) was a Baltic German painter, in the Romantic atyle, associated with the Düsseldorfer Malerschule.

Biography
He was born to Eduard Dücker (1813–1886), a master carpenter, and his wife, Amalie née Fischer (1810–1880). His younger sister, also became a painter. His first drawing lessons were with the lithographer, . 

From 1858 to 1862, he was enrolled at the Imperial Academy of Arts in Saint Petersburg. Upon graduating, he was awarded a six-year grant for a study trip through Europe. He made lengthy stops in Munich and Karlsruhe, where he took lessons from Karl Friedrich Lessing. 

In 1864, he went to Düsseldorf, and would remain there for the rest of his life. He began taking students; notably the Norwegian landscape artist, Adelsteen Normann, and succeeded Oswald Achenbach as the landscape instructor at the Kunstakademie in 1872. Two years later, he married Regina Schneeloch. In his later years, he was a member of the progressive artists' association, Malkasten.  

His well known pupils at the Akademie included Heinrich Hermanns, Franz Korwan, Georg Macco, Otto Modersohn, Fritz Overbeck, Edgar Meyer, Heinrich Petersen-Angeln, Oskar Hoffmann and Carl Wuttke. Despite his career's roots in Germany, he spent much of his time in Estonia, where he painted idyllic landscapes of the sea and the countryside. He also made numerous trips to Holland, Belgium, France and Italy.

Perhaps his best known painting is Coastal landscape (Fishermen going home).

Gallery

References

Further reading
 Dücker, Eugen Gustav. In: Wilhelm Neumann: Lexikon baltischer Künstler. Riga 1908, pg.37 f.
 Walter Cohen: "Dücker, Eugène Gustav". In: Ulrich Thieme (Ed.): Allgemeines Lexikon der Bildenden Künstler von der Antike bis zur Gegenwart, Vol.10: Dubolon–Erlwein. E. A. Seemann, Leipzig 1914, pg.52 (Online)
 Kuno Hagen: Lexikon deutschbaltischer bildender Künstler. 20. Jahrhundert, Verlag Wissenschaft und Politik, Cologne, 1983, pg.33
 "Eugen Dücker",' In: Hans Paffrath (Ed.): Lexikon der Düsseldorfer Malerschule 1819–1918. Vol.1: Abbema–Gurlitt, Kunstmuseum Düsseldorf, Bruckmann, Munich 1997, pp.293–298

External links

 More works by Dücker @ ArtNet

1841 births
1916 deaths
People from Kuressaare
People from Kreis Ösel
Baltic-German people
Estonian painters
19th-century German painters
19th-century German male artists
German male painters
20th-century German painters
20th-century German male artists
Düsseldorf school of painting
Imperial Academy of Arts alumni
Awarded with a large gold medal of the Academy of Arts
Members of the Imperial Academy of Arts
Members of the Royal Swedish Academy of Arts